Nicolás Mentxaka Fernández (11 January 1939 – 10 March 2014) was a Spanish professional footballer who played as a forward.

Early and personal life
Mentxaka was born in Bilbao; his father Nicolás and brother José Luis were also footballers.

Career
Mentxaka played for Athletic Bilbao, Basconia, Barakaldo, Lleida and Burgos.

Mentxaka signed for Athletic Bilbao from Segunda División side Barakaldo in the summer of 1960, and made his La Liga debut against Real Valladolid on 29 September 1960. Athletic sent him on loan spells at Racing Ferrol and Basconia before he settled with the club and made 29 official appearances and scored 11 goals before leaving in 1965. Mentxaka returned to Barakaldo before finishing his career with Burgos in 1967.

References

1939 births
2014 deaths
Spanish footballers
Association football forwards
Athletic Bilbao footballers
CD Basconia footballers
Barakaldo CF footballers
UE Lleida players
Burgos CF footballers
La Liga players
Segunda División players
Footballers from Bilbao